San Gusmè is a village in Tuscany, central Italy, administratively a frazione of the comune of Castelnuovo Berardenga, province of Siena. At the time of the 2001 census its population was 250.

San Gusmè is about 23 km from Siena and 4 km from Castelnuovo Berardenga.

References 

Frazioni of Castelnuovo Berardenga